Sam Boyd (1910–1993) was an American entrepreneur, casino manager and developer.

Sam Boyd may also refer to:
 Sam Boyd (American football) (1914–2001), head football coach at Baylor University, 1956–1958
 Samuel Becket Boyd II (1865–1929), Chief of Knoxville, Tennessee fire department circa 1913
 Samuel Boyd (Northern Ireland politician) (1886/87–?), member of the Senate of Northern Ireland
 Samuel Leonard Boyd, Australian multiple murderer
 Augusto Samuel Boyd (1879–1957), vice president of Panama
 Sam Boyd Stadium, a football stadium in Whitney, Nevada